Ottoor  is a panchayath in Varkala Taluk of Thiruvananthapuram district in the state of Kerala, India. It is situated 7km south-east of Varkala city and 36km north of capital city Trivandrum.

Demographics
 India census, Ottoor had a population of 15359 with 7037 males and 8322 females.

References

Villages in Thiruvananthapuram district